The following is an episode list for the CBS drama, Ghost Whisperer. The show's title is a reference to the main character, Melinda Gordon (portrayed by Jennifer Love Hewitt), who has the ability to see and communicate with the dead.

As of 2011, all seasons are available on DVD. The show was not renewed for a sixth season and was cancelled by CBS on May 18, 2010.

Series overview
{| class="wikitable plainrowheaders" style="text-align:center;"
|-
! colspan="2" rowspan="2" |Season
! rowspan="2" |Episodes
! colspan="2" |Originally aired
|-
! First aired
! Last aired
|-
| style="background: #5B4D5F;"|
| [[List of Ghost Whisperer episodes#Season 1 (2005–06)|1]]
| 22
| September 23, 2005
| May 5, 2006
|-
| style="background: #3C5C5C;"|
| [[List of Ghost Whisperer episodes#Season 2 (2006–07)|2]]
| 22
| September 22, 2006
| May 11, 2007
|-
| style="background: #5ca3c1;"|
| [[List of Ghost Whisperer episodes#Season 3 (2007–08)|3]]
| 18
| September 28, 2007
| May 16, 2008
|-
| style="background: #3F5A78;"|
| [[List of Ghost Whisperer episodes#Season 4 (2008–09)|4]]
| 23
| October 3, 2008
| May 15, 2009
|-
| style="background: #3D325D;"|
| [[List of Ghost Whisperer episodes#Season 5 (2009–10)|5]]
| 22
| September 25, 2009
| May 21, 2010
|}

Episodes

Season 1 (2005–06)

Season 2 (2006–07)

Season 3 (2007–08)

Season 4 (2008–09)

Season 5 (2009–10)

Webisodes

The Other Side (2007)

The Other Side III (2009)

The Other Side IV (2010)

References

General references 
 
 
 

Episodes
Lists of American horror-supernatural television series episodes